Tom Romeo Coronel (born 5 April 1972) is a Dutch professional racing driver. Tom's twin brother Tim is also a racer, just like their father Tom Coronel Sr. His most important results are winning the Marlboro Masters of Formula 3 race in 1997, the Formula Nippon championship in 1999, and the 2006 and 2009 World Touring Car Championship Independents' Trophy. As of September 2016, Tom Coronel has driven over 1,000 races.

He is currently still racing in the WTCC, where he won his first WTCC race in Okayama, Japan in 2008. After competing as an independent driver in a SEAT for many years Tom switched to BMW in 2011. In 2014 Coronel stays with ROAL Motorsport, but the team switched to Chevrolet Cruzes to be built by RML specially for the new TC1 technical regulations. Even though he has no official factory backing, Tom is no longer considered an independent driver, due to his experience and results in the past.
Tom has also been racing for the Dutch Spyker Squadron in the Le Mans Series as well as the 24 Hours of Le Mans for many years. Furthermore, Tom is often invited to join one-off races like the 24 hours at the Nürburgring.

Biography

Early years
Born in Naarden, Coronel started his racing career in 1990 racing in the Dutch Citroën AX Cup, after being named the most talented driver in the local racing school. After a learning debut year, he started to become successful in 1991. With four victories and 105 points he won the title; he also won an international Citroën AX race in Barcelona. He moved up to the Dutch Touring Car Championship in 1992 competing in a BMW 320i. He was crowned champion that same year, beating his older brother and teammate Raymond Coronel. He also started to compete in the Dutch Formula Ford championship, with team Fresh. At the end of 1992 he decided to focus his attention on single seater racing.

He stayed with team Fresh in 1993 and again was a strong competitor. Victorious in three races, he won the Dutch Formula Ford championship that year. Also he came in second in the Benelux championship, behind the Belgian driver Geoffroy Horion (who lost the Dutch championship to Coronel). His participation in a few German Formula Ford races resulted in a handful of podium finishes. He finished ninth in that year's Formula Ford Festival.

European formula
In 1994 Coronel debuted in the Euroseries Formula Opel Lotus, racing for the Dutch Van Amersfoort Racing team. With eight pole positions and two victories he was successful, but lost the championship to Marco Campos. He won the nations cup for the Netherlands together with Donny Crevels and was elected 'Dutch Driver of the year'. This gave him the funds he needed to compete in the next year's German Formula Three championship.

Racing for the WTS team (which delivered previous champions as Michael Schumacher and Jos Verstappen), he was teamed up with Ralf Schumacher. The team used a Dallara chassis which was powered by Opel engines. Scoring 74 points in sixteen races, he finished seventh in the championship results. He did not perform well in the international Formula Three classics, failing to finish in Macau and Monaco and finishing fifth in the Marlboro Masters at Zandvoort.

Moving to the Far East
Coronel decided to search for success far from home, signing up to compete in the Japanese Formula 3 championship with team TOM'S for 1996. He scored his first victory at the Sugo circuit, and this along with five second places earned him the third spot in that year's championship. He came in second with the Italian Prema Power team at the annual Monaco Formula Three race.

He stayed with TOM'S for the next season, the team traded in their own chassis for a more competitive Dallara and used Toyota engines. Coronel dominated the championship, winning six out of the seven races he competed in. His lead was so comfortable that he could afford to miss two races to compete in the Macau Grand Prix and Marlboro Masters. Earlier in the year he was taken out in the leading position at the Monaco Formula Three race, but he was successful for his home crowd in Zandvoort. Starting from the fourth position he drove his way to the lead and followed through until the finish, becoming the second Dutchman to win the event after Jos Verstappen.

Formula Nippon
It was time for Coronel to move to the next level. He stayed in Japan in 1998 competing in the Formula Nippon and Japanese GT championship, both for team Nakajima owned by former Formula One driver Satoru Nakajima.

Driving with a Reynard-Toyota combination, his first Formula Nippon season was expected to be a learning year. Coronel had a relatively poor season, due to some bad luck and the team having never previously worked with a non-Japanese driver. He performed much better in the GT championship. Sharing a Honda NSX with Japanese driver Koji Yamanishi the title was in sight until the last race. Eventually they finished second when the car broke down in the formation lap of the last race.

No changes in Coronel's programme were seen for 1999. In Formula Nippon he proved to be a strong contender for the championship title. At first his main rival reigning champion Satoshi Motoyama build up an advantage over Coronel. But during the year Coronel fought his way back to the front of the championship. Winning his first race at Fuji Speedway he led Motoyama with four points into the last race at Suzuka. Driving side by side a slow starting Coronel and Motoyama crashed into each other in the first corner of the race. Since there were no other competitors for the title Coronel was instantly (but controversially) champion. He was not as successful in the Japanese GT that year, having no chances on the title. Tom made his debut at the 24 Hours of Le Mans with Jan Lammers' Racing for Holland. Teaming up with Lammers and Peter Kox the team kept up with the factory teams, but had to stop after 213 laps due to technical failure.

Formula 1 test
After his Japanese successes Coronel had gained some attention and he decided to focus his energy on finding a Formula One seat. In order to finance his Formula One ambitions, an investment plan was initiated. People could invest in Coronel by buying stocks in 'the Racing Dutchman B.V.'. When Coronel would become successful in Formula One, investors would be repaid. Eventually the plan failed because some of the investors failed to meet the agreements. Coronel tested once for the Arrows team, but lost the chance for a seat in favour of Jos Verstappen and Pedro de la Rosa. Since Coronel had focused his full attention to Formula One, he found himself without a drive for the beginning of the 2000 racing season. He drove the 24 hours of Le Mans for the second time with Racing for Holland and competed in some FIA GT races with Mike Hezemans.

Return to racing
With little racing distance covered the previous year, Coronel wanted to race a full season in 2001. He signed up for the works BMW team to compete in the Dutch Touring Car Championship. Just for the start of the season he was contacted by Lister to compete in the FIA GT Championship. Coronel agreed but had to miss some races since he already signed for BMW. He won races in both championships that year. Also he would compete with Stefan Johansson's team at Le Mans that year, but Johansson retired in the first part of the race.

Coronel moved to the European Touring Car Championship (ETCC) in 2002, he participated for Carly Motors alongside Peter Kox and Gianni Morbidelli. They could not keep up with the works teams, but Coronel still harvested three podium finishes. He stayed with Carly in 2003 but had a 2002 spec chassis for most of the season and struggling to keep up. He and Duncan Huisman won the independents trophy for Carly Motors. He also made a one-year return to the Japanese GT, winning one race in a now outdated Honda NSX. The 2004 ETCC season was very similar for him, although his teammate was now Paulien Zwart, his partner. They won the independents team trophy for the second consecutive year and Coronel won the independent drivers title. He finished his first Le Mans race with Racing for Holland in 2002, finishing eighth in the overall standings. He also made the finish in 2003, this time with a Spyker C8. Returning to Racing for Holland in 2004 he formed a high-profile line up with Justin Wilson and Ralph Firman. However they failed to finish the race. There were some rumours that he had signed a third driver deal with Minardi, but there was never a contract.

World Touring Car Championship

The European Touring Car Championship changed its format to a World Championship in 2005 and Coronel moved teams. He left Carly to join up with Team GR Asia, which used the SEAT Toledo. Coronel had a strong year in which he just missed the Independents trophy in the last race. His luck changed for the better in 2006. With the all new SEAT León he did clinch the title, his second in three seasons. He continued his participation with team GR Asia in 2007, though less successful. For the final round of the 2007 British Touring Car Championship at Thruxton, he raced for SEAT Sport UK to help them win the team's championship and the drivers championship for Jason Plato. In both 2005 and 2006 he drove at the 24 Hours of Le Mans for Spyker, but failed to finish in both attempts.

In 2008, Coronel competed in the brand-new SUNRED SEAT Team in another León. He got his podium in Oschersleben and remains one of the most popular WTCC drivers. Autosport magazine voted him as one of the 10 best WTCC drivers. In the second race at the Race of Japan, on the Okayama International Circuit, an absolutely stunning drive brought him his first victory in the WTCC.

In 2009 he was eligible for the Independents' Trophy, which he won for Sunred. In 2010 he is driving a turbo diesel León for the new semi-works SR-Sport team, which is run by Sunred. Tom finished the season 8th, his highest ever.
In 2011 Tom changed teams to join ROAL Motorsport, formerly running the works-team BMW Italy-Spain. Tom won the second race at Suzuka, Japan, his second WTCC overall victory. Coronel stayed with ROAL Motorsport for 2012, this time as part of a two car effort with Alberto Cerqui joining him in the team.

Dakar Rally
Tom and his twin brother Tim competed in the 2009 edition of the Dakar Rally in Argentina and Chile (Buenos Aires–Valparaíso–Buenos Aires). This was Tom's first edition of Dakar, whereas brother Tim already competed in 2007 and was lined up for the 2008 edition which got cancelled at the last moment. The brothers were driving a Bowler Nemesis for the dakarsport.com outfit and backed to Buenos Aires in 70th position overall after crossing two countries in 15 stages for a total of 6,000 km from January 3–18.

Other activities
The Coronel family owns two indoor go-karting tracks in Huizen and Enschede. Tom co-hosts an automotive programme with Tim called RTL Autowereld (English RTL Carworld) and was a regular guest on the Dutch Formula One broadcast until RTL decided not to go on with the studio shows, in favour of more "on track" time during the broadcast.

Coronel is in a relationship with racing driver Paulien Zwart and they have a daughter and a son together. The pair were teammates at Carly Motors in the 2004 European Touring Car Championship season. Pauline is the daughter of Ascari Cars owner Klaas Zwart, who also raced for Carly in 2004.

Racing record

24 Hours of Le Mans results

Complete JGTC results
(key) (Races in bold indicate pole position) (Races in italics indicate fastest lap)

Complete Formula Nippon results
(key) (Races in bold indicate pole position) (Races in italics indicate fastest lap)

Complete European Super Production Championship results
(key) (Races in bold indicate pole position) (Races in italics indicate fastest lap)

Complete European Touring Car Championship results
(key) (Races in bold indicate pole position) (Races in italics indicate fastest lap)

Complete World Touring Car Championship results
(key) (Races in bold indicate pole position) (Races in italics indicate fastest lap)

† Driver did not finish the race, but was classified as he completed over 90% of the race distance.

Complete British Touring Car Championship results
(key) (Races in bold indicate pole position – 1 point awarded in first race) (Races in italics indicate fastest lap – 1 point awarded all races) (* signifies that driver lead race for at least one lap – 1 point awarded all races)

Complete TCR International Series results
(key) (Races in bold indicate pole position) (Races in italics indicate fastest lap)

Complete World Touring Car Cup results
(key) (Races in bold indicate pole position) (Races in italics indicate fastest lap)

† Driver did not finish the race, but was classified as he completed over 90% of the race distance.

Complete TCR Europe Touring Car Series results
(key) (Races in bold indicate pole position) (Races in italics indicate fastest lap)

TCR Spa 500 results

References

External links

  
 
Official website of Dakaroutfit Tom Coronel 
website of Coronel family and karting tracks 
website of Dutch TV programme that Tom co-hosts with his brother 

1972 births
Living people
People from Naarden
Dutch racing drivers
Formula Nippon drivers
German Formula Three Championship drivers
Japanese Formula 3 Championship drivers
World Touring Car Championship drivers
British Touring Car Championship drivers
24 Hours of Le Mans drivers
FIA GT Championship drivers
Off-road racing drivers
Dutch Sephardi Jews
Jewish Dutch sportspeople
Formula Ford drivers
American Le Mans Series drivers
European Le Mans Series drivers
Eurocup Mégane Trophy drivers
Blancpain Endurance Series drivers
24 Hours of Spa drivers
European Touring Car Championship drivers
European Touring Car Cup drivers
Twin sportspeople
Dutch twins
Dakar Rally co-drivers
World Touring Car Cup drivers
24H Series drivers
Súper TC 2000 drivers
FIA Motorsport Games drivers
Sportspeople from North Holland
Opel Team BSR drivers
Nakajima Racing drivers
Mugen Motorsports drivers
American Spirit Team Johansson drivers
TDS Racing drivers
TOM'S drivers
Nürburgring 24 Hours drivers
Kondō Racing drivers
Comtoyou Racing drivers
Cupra Racing drivers
Boutsen Ginion Racing drivers
GT4 European Series drivers
Engstler Motorsport drivers
TCR Europe Touring Car Series drivers